The Tyler Hotel opened in 1910 at Third and Jefferson Streets in Louisville, Kentucky, and for many years it was the only major hotel in the northern part of downtown. The hotel became the Earle Hotel in the late 1940s and then the Milner Hotel in the early 1960s after its new owner, Earle Milner. In 1995, it was torn down to make space for the Kentucky International Convention Center.

See also
McDonald & Dodd
National Register of Historic Places listings in Downtown Louisville, Kentucky

References

 Postcard History Series - Louisville, by John E. Findling (Pg17)

Demolished buildings and structures in Louisville, Kentucky
Hotel buildings on the National Register of Historic Places in Kentucky
National Register of Historic Places in Louisville, Kentucky
Buildings and structures demolished in 1995
1910 establishments in Kentucky
1995 disestablishments in Kentucky
Demolished hotels in the United States
Hotel buildings completed in 1910
Demolished but still listed on the National Register of Historic Places